North Star Air is a Canadian charter, passenger and cargo airline headquartered in Thunder Bay, Ontario, with secondary passenger hub in Sioux Lookout, Ontario, and cargo hubs located in Pickle Lake, Red Lake, Kapuskasing and Thompson, Manitoba. The majority of destinations served are First Nations communities, with regular service to 18 airports under "Flex Flight Passenger Service", and other regional destinations under an on-demand basis. Founded in 1997 as a floatplane operator with two DHC-2 Beaver aircraft based in Pickle Lake, the airline has grown over the years and came under new ownership in 2012. In 2015 Cargo North and North Star Air merged under the North Star banner. In 2022 North Star Air opened up their brand new cargo depot based in Winnipeg.

On 28 April 2017, it was announced that North Star Air had been purchased by The North West Company for a sum of $31 million.

First Nation Community Partners
 Cat Lake First Nation
 Deer Lake First Nation
 Eabametoong First Nation
 Kashechewan First Nation
 Marten Falls First Nation
 Neskantaga First Nation
 North Caribou Lake First Nation
 North Spirit Lake First Nation
 Poplar Hill First Nation
 Sachigo Lake First Nation
 Webequie First Nation

Destinations
Flex Flight Passenger Services
As of 2023 North Star Air flies to the following destinations:
 Bearskin Lake First Nation (Bearskin Lake Airport)
 Cat Lake First Nation (Cat Lake Airport)
 Deer Lake First Nation (Deer Lake Airport)
 Eabametoong First Nation (Fort Hope Airport)
 Kitchenuhmaykoosib Inninuwug First Nation (Big Trout Lake) (Big Trout Lake Airport)
 Muskrat Dam Lake First Nation (Muskrat Dam Airport)
 Neskantaga First Nation (Lansdowne House) (Lansdowne House Airport)
 North Caribou Lake First Nation (Round Lake (Weagamow Lake) Airport)
 North Spirit Lake First Nation (North Spirit Lake Airport)
 Marten Falls First Nation (Ogoki Post) (Ogoki Post Airport)
 Pikangikum First Nation (Pikangikum Airport)
 Poplar Hill First Nation (Poplar Hill Airport)
 Red Lake (Red Lake Airport)
 Sachigo Lake First Nation (Sachigo Lake Airport)
 Sioux Lookout (Sioux Lookout Airport)
 Thunder Bay (Thunder Bay International Airport)
 Wapekeka First Nation (Angling Lake/Wapekeka Airport)
 Webequie First Nation (Webequie Airport)

Fleet
As of May 2021 North Star Air had the following 14 aircraft registered with Transport Canada and list 18 on their website.

Bases 
Thunder Bay
Sioux Lookout
Kapuskasing
Pickle Lake
Red Lake
Thompson

References

External links

 North Star Air

Companies based in Thunder Bay
Regional airlines of Ontario